James Letson Frizzell (16 February 1937 – 3 July 2016) was a Scottish association football player and manager.

Frizzell was appointed a patron of Oldham Athletic's supporters' trust, Trust Oldham in 2004.

Playing career
Frizzell began his career at Greenock Morton as a forward in 1957. Three years later, he joined Oldham Athletic, where he played 318 matches and scored 57 goals initially as a forward and then in the wing-half and full-back roles.

Managerial career
A managerial career was started in March 1970 when Frizzell became manager of Oldham Athletic, following a spell as a coach under Jack Rowley. At the time, the club was near the bottom of Division Four, with the distinct possibility of having to re-apply for League status. He then guided the team to nine wins and six draws in the remaining 22 matches and a comfortable midtable finish. In the following season Oldham achieved promotion to Division Three and in 1974 they won the Third Division championship. The club survived in the Second Division bar only a couple of flirts with relegation, yet despite his success at the helm of the club, Frizzell was surprisingly dismissed in June 1982. He was at the time the second longest serving manager in the Football League.

After a year unemployed, Frizzell was invited to join Manchester City as an assistant to Billy McNeill. He became manager after the exit of his former boss in October 1986. Frizzell was sacked in May 1987 as the team was relegated to the Division Two under a serious financial crisis. He returned to the club in 1994 to work as chief scout but left in 1998.

Death
Frizzell died on 3 July 2016.

References

External links

Jimmy Frizzell  at Trust Oldham

1937 births
2016 deaths
Scottish footballers
Greenock Morton F.C. players
Oldham Athletic A.F.C. players
Scottish Football League players
English Football League players
Scottish football managers
Oldham Athletic A.F.C. managers
Manchester City F.C. managers
English Football League managers
Association football inside forwards
Footballers from Greenock